Cassius Jerome Stanley (born August 18, 1999) is an American professional basketball player for the Rio Grande Valley Vipers of the NBA G League. He played college basketball for the Duke Blue Devils.

High school career
Stanley first attended Harvard-Westlake School in Studio City, California. As a sophomore, Stanley averaged 17.9 points, 6.8 rebounds, and 3.5 assists per game. In 2017, Stanley transferred to Sierra Canyon School in Chatsworth, California for his last two years of high school. As a senior, he averaged 17.8 points, 6.2 rebounds, and 2.9 assists per game while leading the Sierra Canyon to a 32–3 overall record.

Recruiting
On April 22, 2019, Stanley committed to play at Duke University.

College career
In his college debut, Stanley scored 13 points to help Duke defeat Kansas 68–66. After injuring his leg in a victory over Winthrop on November 29, Stanley was ruled out indefinitely. However, after his leg improved quicker than expected due to rehabilitation and physical therapy, he returned to play against Virginia Tech after missing just one game. On January 4, Stanley scored 20 points and five rebounds in a 95–62 win over Miami. On February 8, Stanley recorded 22 points and six rebounds in a 98–96 overtime victory over rival North Carolina. At the conclusion of the regular season, Stanley was selected to the ACC All-Freshman Team. Stanley averaged 12.6 points and 4.9 rebounds per game, shooting 47 percent from the floor and 36 percent shooting from three-point range. Following the season, he declared for the 2020 NBA draft.

Professional career

Indiana Pacers (2020–2021)
On November 18, 2020, Stanley was drafted in the second round, 54th overall, in the 2020 NBA draft by the Indiana Pacers. The Pacers signed Stanley to a two-way contract with their NBA G League affiliate, the Fort Wayne Mad Ants. He participated in the 2021 Slam Dunk Contest; however, he was eliminated following the opening round.

Detroit Pistons / Motor City Cruise (2021–2022)
On September 28, 2021, Stanley signed with the Detroit Pistons. On October 16, 2021, Stanley was waived by the Pistons. He was added to the Motor City Cruise in October 2021. Stanley averaged 9.6 points and 4.5 rebounds per game with the Cruise. On December 25, 2021, he signed a 10-day contract with the Detroit Pistons.

On January 4, 2022, Stanley was reacquired by the Motor City Cruise of the NBA G League. On January 8, he signed another 10-day contract with the Pistons. On January 18, 2022, Stanley was reacquired by the Motor City Cruise. On January 21, 2022, Stanley signed a third 10-day contract with the Detroit Pistons and returned to Motor City on January 31.

Rio Grande Valley Vipers (2022–present)
On November 3, 2022, Stanley was named to the opening night roster for the Rio Grande Valley Vipers.

Career statistics

NBA

Regular season

|-
| style="text-align:left;"| 
| style="text-align:left;"| Indiana
| 24 || 0 || 3.9 || .302 || .231 || .778 || .8 || .0 || .0 || .1 || 1.5
|-
| style="text-align:left;"| 
| style="text-align:left;"| Detroit
| 9 || 1 || 17.2 || .413 || .235 || 1.000 || 2.1 || .4 || .6 || .2 || 5.8
|- class="sortbottom"
| style="text-align:center;" colspan="2"|Career
| 33 || 1 || 7.5 || .360 || .233 || .895 || 1.2 || .2 || .2 || .1 || 2.7

College

|-
| style="text-align:left;"|2019–20
| style="text-align:left;"|Duke
| 29 || 29 || 27.4 || .474 || .360 || .733 || 4.9 || 1.0 || .7 || .7 || 12.6

References

External links
 Duke Blue Devils bio
 USA Basketball bio

1999 births
Living people
21st-century African-American sportspeople
African-American basketball players
American men's basketball players
Basketball players from Los Angeles
Detroit Pistons players
Duke Blue Devils men's basketball players
Fort Wayne Mad Ants players
Harvard-Westlake School alumni
Indiana Pacers draft picks
Indiana Pacers players
Motor City Cruise players
Rio Grande Valley Vipers players
Shooting guards
Sierra Canyon School alumni